Omorgus umbonatus is a beetle of the family Trogidae.

References

umbonatus
Beetles described in 1854